Chinnakani is a village in Andhara Pradesh, India.

Villages in Guntur district